The Zubly Cemetery near Beech Island, South Carolina, which is a small community in Aiken County, South Carolina was established around 1790 by Swiss settlers of the nearby New Windsor Township. It illustrates the vernacular burial customs of the period. The town of New Windsor, settled in 1737, eventually became an outpost for Indian traders. Zubly Cemetery was listed on the National Register of Historic Places on January 28, 2002.

References

External links
 
 

Cemeteries on the National Register of Historic Places in South Carolina
1790 establishments in South Carolina
Buildings and structures in Aiken County, South Carolina
Swiss-American culture in South Carolina
National Register of Historic Places in Aiken County, South Carolina